Relative Values may refer to:

 Relative Values (film), a 2000 British comedy film adaptation of the 1950s play of the same name by Noël Coward
 Relative Values (play), a three-act comedy by Noël Coward